Dobřany (1939–1945: Wiesengrund) is a town in Plzeň-South District in the Plzeň Region of the Czech Republic. It has about 6,100 inhabitants. The historic town centre is well preserved and is protected by law as urban monument zone.

Administrative parts
Villages of Šlovice and Vodní Újezd are administrative parts of Dobřany.

Geography
It lies on the border between the Plasy Uplands and Švihov Highlands. The Radbuza River flows through the municipality.

History
The first written mention of Dobřany is from 1243. Around the mid-13th century, the settlement was referred to as a town. Around 1265, after the death of the then-owner of the town Jan of Dobřany, the town was acquired by the Chotěšov Abbey. The monastery granted the town new rights. Dobřany benefited from a favorable location and was a market centre for a wide area, although its importance decreased with the founding of the new city of Plzeň in 1295.

During the Hussite Wars, Dobřany was conquered by the army of Jan Žižka. After 1437, the monastery regained the town. In 1585, the town received a customs duty, the proceeds of which were to be used for the repair of the bridge and roads. Due to the ecclesiastical authority, Dobřany remained Catholic even during the growing Reformation.

The town's prosperity ended only with the Thirty Years' War. Dobřany ceased to be property of the monastery in 1618 and was acquired by Jáchym Lubský. The town was burned down by various armies in 1620 and 1632, then it was looted by army of Lennart Torstensson in 1645. Dobřany became depopulated, but was gradually resettled by families from Saxony and Bavaria and became German-speaking. By the mid-18th century, the town had grown and was larger than before the Thirty Years' War.

From 1938 to 1945, Dobřany was annexed by Nazi Germany and administered as part of Reichsgau Sudetenland.

Demographics

Economy
The town is known for its psychiatric hospital.

Transport
The D5 motorway passes through the northern part of the municipal territory.

Sights

The Church of Saint Nicholas is the main landmark of the town square. The Gothic church was first documented in 1259. After it was damaged several times, it was baroque rebuilt in 1756–1758. The free-standing baroque bell tower was built in 1694–1700.

The Church of Saint Vitus was first mentioned in 1260 and stands right across from the Church of Saint Nicholas. The current building was built on the site of the old church in 1727–1734. It was built in the Baroque style according to the project of Jakub Auguston. The premises of the church are used as the town's gallery.

The Baroque stone bridge over the Radbuza has a Gothic core and was first documented in the second half of the 16th century. Its present form dates from 1879, when the heavily damaged bridge was reconstructed. It is a valuable technical monument.

Notable people
Jan Josef Ignác Brentner (1689–1742), composer
Joseph Maria Wolfram (1789–1839), German-Bohemian politician
Norbert Ormay (1813–1849), colonel in the Hungarian Army

Twin towns – sister cities

Dobřany is twinned with:
 Brežice, Slovenia
 Dobřany, Czech Republic
 Obertraubling, Germany

References

External links

Cities and towns in the Czech Republic
Populated places in Plzeň-South District